The HAL HJT-36 Sitara (Sitārā: "star") is a subsonic intermediate jet trainer aircraft designed and developed by Aircraft Research and Design Centre (ARDC) and built by Hindustan Aeronautics Limited (HAL) for the Indian Air Force and the Indian Navy. The HJT-36 will replace the HAL HJT-16 Kiran as the Stage-2 trainer for the two forces.

The Sitara is a conventional jet trainer with low swept wings, tandem cockpit and small air intakes for the engine on either side of its fuselage. It entered limited series production by 2010 but according to the Indian Air Force officials it remained "unfit" for service due to technological issues related to spin test (as of March 2017)., an issue which was only solved in tests in January 2022. In April 2019, Sitara flew for the first time in three years with a modified air frame to correct its spin characteristics.

Design & development 

HAL started design work on an intermediate jet trainer in 1997. The concept was developed as a successor to HAL's earlier trainer, the HJT-16 Kiran, introduced in 1968. In 1999, following reviews by the Indian Air Force, the Government of India awarded HAL a contract for the development, testing, and certification of two prototype IJT aircraft.
HJT-36 uses light alloys and composites, with a conventional low wing design with 18° leading-edge sweepback and a 9.8m wingspan. It features a hydraulically retractable tricycle-type landing gear. The single-wheeled main units retract inward and the twin nose wheel unit retracts forward. About a quarter of the aircraft's line replaceable units are common between it and the HAL Tejas trainer variant.

In the cockpit, the HJT-36 has a conventional tandem two-seat configuration with the trainee pilot forward and the instructor in the raised seat to the rear. The single-piece canopy gives both pilots good, all-round vision. The prototype aircraft used Zvezda K-26LT lightweight zero-zero ejection seats. However, these may be replaced with Martin-Baker Mk.16 IN16S seats, due to a price escalation of the former. The pilots have both conventional and manual flight controls.

The trainer has a full glass cockpit with a layout similar to current generation combat aircraft. It uses an integrated digital avionics system from GE Aviation Systems. Head-up display and repeater is produced by Elbit Systems.

The aircraft has five external hardpoints for weapons training. There is one center-line hardpoint under the fuselage and two-weapon pylons under each wing for carrying rockets, gun pods, and bombs. The maximum external payload is 1,000 kg.

The prototype aircraft was initially powered by a SNECMA Turbomeca Larzac 04-H-20 non-afterburning turbofan developing 14.12 kN of thrust. All production models will use the more powerful NPO Saturn AL-55I engine with about 16.9 kN of thrust, as stipulated by the 2005 air staff requirements from the Air Force.

Development

2000s
The first and second prototypes of the HJT-36, labeled PT-1 and PT-2, flew on 7 March 2003 and in March 2004, respectively. The program was then delayed with the Air Force assessing the SNECMA Turbomeca Larzac engine, with 14.1 kN of thrust, as under-powered. In response, in August 2005, HAL reached a deal to replace the SNECMA engine with the NPO Saturn AL-55I with 16.9 kN of thrust. The deal also provided for license-production of the engine in India by HAL.
Further delays were caused by delays in delivery of the NPO Saturn engine by 2 years, as well as due to two accidents in February 2007 and in February 2009 involving each of the prototypes, which grounded the aircraft for repairs and investigations.
The first AL-55I engine was received from Russia on 28 December 2008, 2 years later than committed, and was installed on PT-1. Following ground taxiing trials, flight tests with the new engine started on 9 May 2009.

2010
After further development and extensive testing, the Indian Air Force placed an order for 73 aircraft. After over 280 test flights, the aircraft entered limited series production in 2009 for the first 12 aircraft to be delivered to the Air Force. 
The first flight test for the limited series aircraft occurred in January 2010, and initial operational capability was expected by July 2011. The Air Force order was expected to grow to over 200 aircraft.

2012
On 27 July 2012, first Engine Ground Run was performed on third prototype.

2013
In December 2013, HAL declared that Sitara was 'weeks' from certification.

2014
On 19 February 2014, the Indian MOD submitted a statement that the development of IJT was in the advanced stages of certification, with more than 800 test flights completed so far. The activities were progressing well with completion of sea level trials, night flying trials, high altitude trials as well as weapon and drop tank trials. The activities left for obtaining Final Operational Clearance (FOC) are the refinement of stall characteristics, and spin testing which will be commenced as soon as stall characteristics were refined. All efforts were being made to achieve FOC by December 2014. Production of aircraft was to commence immediately thereafter. However the stall cannot be tested until HAL redesigns the entire aircraft to correct its "inherent asymmetry". 
BAE Systems was consulted on certain design changes, specifically the tail. Afterwards the design was put to mathematical and wind tunnel tests. The modified aircraft was expected to complete the spin tests by September 2015, and the production of 85 aircraft for the Indian Air Force to begin.

2017
In March 2017, Jane's reported that due to the HJT-36's "unsolvable" issues associated with critical stall and spin characteristics the aircraft is not ready to serve as an intermediate jet trainer for Indian Air Force pilots.

2019
With Birhle as a consultant, the air frame was modified to move the tailfin and tailplane further down which is expected to make spin recovery easier. The modified aircraft flew for the first time in April 2019.

2022
On 6th January, the IJT has successfully demonstrated the capability to carry out six turn spins to both the left and right hand sides.

Specifications (HJT-36, prototypes)

See also

References

External links 

 HAL Intermediate Jet Trainer HJT-36 by Wg.Cdr Kukke Suresh VrC(Retd.) @ Bharat-rakshak.com
 Bharat-Rakshak Monitor: Sitara - Intermediate Jet Trainer - HJT-36 by H. Niranjan Rao
 Photos of the two prototypes @ Bharat-rakshak.com
 ACIG Exclusive: 15 Photos of two HJT-36 prototypes and its cockpit

Sitara
2000s Indian military trainer aircraft
Single-engined jet aircraft
Low-wing aircraft
Aircraft first flown in 2003